Major John Robert Perceval-Maxwell (1896–1963) was an Ulster Unionist Party politician from Northern Ireland.

Perceval-Maxwell was educated at Eton College and the Royal Military College, Sandhurst. He was called to the Bar but did not practice as a Barrister. From 1935 to 1941 he was a member of the Senate of Northern Ireland, and again from 1941 until his resignation in 1945.  Between 1937 and 1937 he was Deputy Speaker of the Senate.

He sat in the Northern Ireland House of Commons representing Ards from the general election of 1945  until the general election of 1949. when he retired after being deselected. He was Parliamentary Secretary to the Ministry of Commerce from 21 September 1945 to 26 February 1949.

He lived at Finnebrogue House, Downpatrick.

References

1896 births
1963 deaths
People educated at Eton College
Ulster Unionist Party members of the House of Commons of Northern Ireland
Members of the House of Commons of Northern Ireland 1945–1949
Members of the Senate of Northern Ireland 1933–1937
Members of the Senate of Northern Ireland 1937–1941
Members of the Senate of Northern Ireland 1941–1945
Members of the House of Commons of Northern Ireland for County Down constituencies
Northern Ireland junior government ministers (Parliament of Northern Ireland)
Ulster Unionist Party members of the Senate of Northern Ireland